Luca Colombo may refer to:

Luca Colombo (footballer)
Luca Colombo (cyclist)